Case départ (Tee box) is a 2011 French comedy film directed by Lionel Steketee, Fabrice Eboué and Thomas N'Gijol.

Plot
Half-brothers Régis (Fabrice Eboue) and Joel (Thomas Tgijol) Grosdésir are called to their estranged father's deathbed in the French Antilles. He has nothing to bequeath them but the family treasure - the certificate of manumission that freed their common ancestor from slavery.

Unfortunately Régis and Joel are observed by their aunt (Isabel del Carmen Solar Montalvo) as they tear the precious document up and mock it. She is enraged and casts a spell to send them back to the 18th century, where they are immediately picked up and sold as slaves. In a Back to the Future style coming-of-age storyline they must help their great-grandparents to meet and fall in love, if they have any hope of returning to their lives - or to a better version of themselves.

Cast
 Fabrice Eboué – Régis Grosdésir
 Thomas N'Gijol – Joël Grosdésir
 Stéfi Celma – Rosalie
 Eriq Ebouaney – Isidore
 Joséphine de Meaux – Joséphine Jourdain
 Catherine Hosmalin – Madame Jourdain
 Étienne Chicot – Monsieur Jourdain
 Blanche Gardin – Corinne
 Nicolas Marié – The Mayor
 Franck de la Personne – The Priest
 David Salles – M Henri
 Doudou Masta – Neg' Marron's Chief

References

External links
 

2010s French-language films
2011 films
French comedy films
Films about race and ethnicity
Films about slavery
Films set in the 18th century
Films set in the 1770s
Films shot in Cuba
2011 comedy films
Films directed by Lionel Steketee
Films directed by Fabrice Eboué
2010s French films
Films about time travel